Ivan Petrovich Dombrovskyy (born 7 March 1947 in Tsekhanivka, Odessa Oblast) is Ukrainian jurist, notary, electro-welder, and a judge of Constitutional Court of Ukraine and Supreme Court of Ukraine.

He was a judge of the Constitutional Court of Ukraine since 4 August 2006 and its chairman since 19 September 2006. He was elected under the Congress of Judges' quota and is the oldest among the current judges of Constitutional Court. He resigned from the position of chairman of the Constitutional Court on 17 May 2007, and was replaced by Valeriy Pshenychnyy.

After Pshenychnyy was dismissed along with his deputy chairman Stanik, Dombrovskyy seems to have become acting chairman and the oldest judge in the court. He has presided on a few sessions prior to 10 July 2007 when the new chairman was elected.

Footnotes

External links
 
 

1947 births
Living people
People from Odesa Oblast
Ukrainian judges
Ukrainian jurists
Constitutional Court of Ukraine judges
Judges of the Supreme Court of Ukraine
Welders
Notaries
Laureates of the Honorary Diploma of the Verkhovna Rada of Ukraine
Recipients of the Honorary Diploma of the Cabinet of Ministers of Ukraine